Nay or NAY may refer to:
Nay (name)
Ney (also nay, nye, nai), a wind instrument
Nay, Manche, a place in the Manche  département of France
Nay, Pyrénées-Atlantiques, a place in the Pyrénées-Atlantiques  département of France
Nay-ye Olya, a village in Khuzestan Province, Iran
Nay-ye Sofla, a village in Khuzestan Province, Iran
Nay, Iran, a village in Razavi Khorasan Province, Iran
Kalateh-ye Nay, a village in Razavi Khorasan Province, Iran
 Ernst Wilhelm Nay, German abstract painter
 an abbreviation for the Mexican state Nayarit
 Beijing Nanyuan Airport, China; IATA airport code NAY
 Newton Aycliffe railway station, England; National Rail station code NAY
 An archaic form of no, used mainly in oral voting, and the opposite of yea

See also
Nai (disambiguation)
Ney (disambiguation)
Neigh (disambiguation)